Víctor Álvarez Rozada (born 16 September 1997), commonly known as Viti, is a Spanish footballer who plays for Real Oviedo as a winger.

Club career
Viti was born in Pola de Laviana, Laviana, Asturias. A Real Oviedo youth graduate, he made his senior debut with the reserves on 10 May 2015, aged only 17, coming on as a second-half substitute in a 1–0 away win against Atlético de Lugones SD in the Tercera División.

Despite being still registered with the Juvenil squad, Viti was called up to the first team for a Segunda División match against CD Leganés on 26 May 2016. He made his professional debut just hours later, replacing Jon Erice in the 79th minute of the 0–1 home defeat.

Viti scored his first senior goal on 13 November 2016, netting the equalizer in a 1–1 home draw against Sporting de Gijón B. The following 7 May, he renewed his contract with the club.

On 11 June 2019, Viti was one of the seven players from the B-side who were promoted to the main squad for the 2019–20 campaign.

References

External links

1997 births
Living people
People from Laviana
Spanish footballers
Footballers from Asturias
Association football wingers
Segunda División players
Segunda División B players
Tercera División players
Real Oviedo Vetusta players
Real Oviedo players